An .XIP file is a XAR archive that can be digitally signed for integrity. The .XIP file format was introduced in OS X 10.9, along with Apple's release of Swift. .XIP allows for a digital signature to be applied and verified on the receiving system before the archive is expanded. When a XIP file is opened (by double-clicking), Archive Utility will automatically expand it (but only if the digital signature is intact).

Apple has reserved the right to use the .XIP file format exclusively, removing it from public use since release. Starting with macOS Sierra, only .XIP archives signed by Apple will be expanded. Developers who had been using .XIP archives were required to move to using signed installer packages or disk images.

References 

Archive formats